Harry Lawson (11 May 1881 – 17 October 1955) was a track and field athlete who competed in the 1908 Summer Olympics for Canada. He finished seventh in the men's marathon. He was born in Leeds, West Yorkshire, England.

References

External links
Olympic profile

1881 births
1955 deaths
Sportspeople from Leeds
English emigrants to Canada
Canadian male marathon runners
Olympic track and field athletes of Canada
Athletes (track and field) at the 1908 Summer Olympics